Megachile schmiedeknechti is a species of bee in the family Megachilidae. It was described by Costa in 1884.

References

Schmiedeknechti
Insects described in 1884